Jonathan Galloway (born 19 June 1996) is a Guamanian professional basketball player for SAM Massagno. Galloway also represents the Guam national basketball team.

College career
Galloway started out as a redshirt for the 2014-15 season and joined the UC Irvine Anteaters a year later. He was named the Big West Conference Defensive Player of the Year three seasons in a row.

Professional career
In the 2019-20 season, he played for the Bakken Bears of the Basketligaen, Denmark's prime basketball division. There, he averaged 21.5 minutes per game, with and an efficiency rating of 13.6 over the 20-game season – 8.2 points, 8.9 rebounds, 1.5 blocks and 1.2 assists per game. He helped Bears win the Basketligaen title.

For the 2021–22 season, Galloway was on the roster of Turkish club TED Ankara Kolejliler.

On November 1, 2021, he has signed with Bisons Loimaa of the Korisliiga.

Guam national team
Galloway suited up for Guam's national basketball team on numerous occasions. He was a key component of the island’s newfound success at the Pacific Games.

He has further represented Guam at the 2021 FIBA Asia Cup qualification.

On representing Guam internationally, he stated "Thank you Coach (E.J.) Calvo, Guam Basketball and the rest of the island for always embracing me. It’s an honor wearing Guam on my chest".

Player profile
Both Galloway and his former College coach Russell Turner state that his greatest assets as a basketball player are his defense and rebounding ability.

Personal
Galloway holds a bachelor’s degree in criminology, law and society.

References

External links
UC Irvine bio 
Profile at ESPN
Profile at Eurobasket.com

1996 births
TED Ankara Kolejliler players
Living people
Bakken Bears players
BBC Monthey players
Bisons Loimaa players
Centers (basketball)
Guamanian men's basketball players
KK Zadar players
People from Brentwood, California
Power forwards (basketball)
UC Irvine Anteaters men's basketball players